Scopula chionaeata is a moth of the family Geometridae. It was described by Gottlieb August Wilhelm Herrich-Schäffer in 1870. It is endemic to Cuba.

References

Moths described in 1870
chionaeata
Endemic fauna of Cuba
Moths of the Caribbean